Noor or Nour may refer to:

People
Noor (name)
Queen Noor of Jordan

Fiction
Noor (film), a 2017 Bollywood film
Noor (play), a 2009 play by Akbar Ahmed
Noor, a 2020 Pakistani television series with Usama Khan
Noor (2022 TV series), a 2022 Pakistani television series starring Romaisa Khan and Shehroze Sabzwari
Noor (novel), a 2022 Africanfuturist novel by Nnedi Okorafor
Noor, an album by the metal band Adorned Brood
Noor, the Arabic title for Turkish soap opera Gümüş and a character in the series

Places
Noor (Meuse), a river in the Netherlands and Belgium
Noor, Iran, a city in northern Iran and capital of the Noor county
Noor County, a county in Mazandaran Province in Iran
Noor Palace, Sweden

Other uses
Noor (horse), an Irish-bred Thoroughbred racehorse
Nūr (Islam), a concept in Islam
Noor (missile), a version of C-802
Noor (satellite), a series of satellites; included the first Iranian military satellite
NOOR photo agency, a documentary photography collective and foundation 
Ouarzazate solar power station (Noor 1), a concentrated solar power station in Ouarzazate, Morocco

See also 
 
 An-Nur (The Light), the 24th sura of the Qur'an
 Nour (actress) (born 1977), Lebanese actress
 Nur (disambiguation)